Lou Mulvihill (born November 17, 1952) is a Canadian former ice sledge hockey player. He won a  bronze medal with Team Canada at the 1994 Winter Paralympics. He also competed at the 2002 Winter Paralympics.

References

Living people
Paralympic sledge hockey players of Canada
Canadian sledge hockey players
Paralympic bronze medalists for Canada
Paralympic silver medalists for Canada
1952 births
Medalists at the 1994 Winter Paralympics
Paralympic medalists in sledge hockey
Ice sledge hockey players at the 1994 Winter Paralympics